Argyresthia amiantella is a moth of the family Yponomeutidae. It is found in France, Germany, Poland, the Czech Republic, Slovakia, Austria, Switzerland, Italy and Serbia and Montenegro.

The larvae probably feed on Picea abies.

References

Moths described in 1847
Argyresthia
Moths of Europe